Patrick McKenna (born May 8, 1960) is a Canadian comedian and actor. He is best known for playing Harold Green on the television series The Red Green Show.

Early life
Patrick McKenna became interested in Second City when a high-school teacher took him to a show at Second City Toronto. After he graduated from high school, he attended Sheridan College, graduating with a business degree in 1982.

Career
To help with tuition, he worked his way to being night manager at Second City, learning how improv worked. In 1983, he auditioned successfully for the main stage. During the 1980s he tried his hand at standup and spent five years performing his act in Canada and the US.

One night at Second City during the late 1980s, McKenna received the acting offer which would change his life. Steve Smith was recruiting cast members, especially a sidekick, for his new project, The Red Green Show. He had come to Second City and was checking out the entire troupe, but when Patrick did his twitchy-nerd character, Smith knew he had his sidekick. He offered McKenna a job after the show. McKenna appeared on television screens throughout Canada and the US for the next 15 years as the lovable nephew Harold Green on The Red Green Show.

He also played Marty Stephens on Traders, working alongside future Stargate SG-1 and Stargate Atlantis Canadian actor David Hewlett. For his work on Traders and The Red Green Show, McKenna received two Gemini Awards. He is the only Canadian actor to win for both drama and comedy in the same year, at the 13th Gemini Awards on 4 October 1998.

McKenna guest-starred in two episodes of Stargate SG-1 playing Dr. Jay Felger, first in the season 6 episode "The Other Guys" and then in the season 7 episode "Avenger 2.0". He also starred in the 2002 Trudeau miniseries.  

In 2006, McKenna played producer Jeffrey Littleman on the short-lived CBC television series Getting Along Famously. In 2007, he appeared in the pilot of Sabbatical. He starred as Victor in the 2011 indie horror film Silent but Deadly. In late 2011, he played the politician and Canadian Confederation leader Alexander Galt in the CBC television movie John A: Birth of a Country. Throughout the mid-2000s and early 2010s, McKenna saw work as a voice actor in Canadian animated series such as Atomic Betty, Iggy Arbuckle, Crash Canyon and Sidekick.

McKenna was the subject of the 2009 PBS documentary ADD and Loving It?! McKenna has ADHD, but was not diagnosed until he was well into his forties. He has become somewhat of a spokesman on this condition in Canada. McKenna and Rick Green, writer and performer and co-creator of The Red Green Show, made a documentary to explain some of ADHD's positives and negatives titled "ADD and Loving It."  Both men open up about how it has affected them and their relationships.

Charitable work
McKenna has become involved with many charity organizations and causes—including wheelchair athletes, Adult ADHD, MS Society, Lupus Canada and McMaster Sick Kids—some of which he has personal connection with.

McKenna suffered a debilitating back injury in the early 2000s that left him unable to walk for a year. He went through times of being in a wheelchair and having to learn to walk again. It was from this experience that he became involved with wheelchair athletes.

His mother, Patricia, has suffered from lupus since the 1970s. McKenna's friend and fellow Second City alumnus Colin Mochrie and his wife Debra McGrath often help McKenna with lupus charity fundraising.

Personal life
McKenna is a member of Toronto's The Second City comedy troupe.

McKenna's mother's name is Patricia, and he has three brothers. He married his high school sweetheart, Janis, in 1983. They have a son, Brendon, born in 1985. Brendon McKenna was seen in two episodes, Dancing with Mr. D. and The Unseen Lever, of his father's series Traders as Marty's son, Mark Stephens.

Filmography
 The Red Green Show (Harold Green)
 Traders (Marty Stephens)
 Sam & Max: Freelance Police!!! (Lorne, the Friend for Life)
 Little Mosque on the Prairie (The Principal)
 Stargate SG-1 (2 eps.) (Dr. Jay Felger)
 Crash Canyon (Norm Wendell / Vernon Wendell)
 Due South (Pizzas and Promises, season 1, ep. 5) (Gary Redfield)
 Getting Along Famously (Jeffrey Littleman)
 Iggy Arbuckle (Robear)
 Atomic Betty (Quincy Barrett)
 Best Ed (Doug aka Buddy)
 The Border (Don Campbell)
 Spliced (Two-legs "Joe")
 Clang Invasion (Rivet)
 Bill 'n' Lloyd (Krasky the Klown)
 Detective Squirrel Jr. (Dad)
 Wingin' It (Mr. Telson)
 New Outer Limits: Mindreacher Episode (Dr. Seigal)
 Sidekick (Pamplemoose)
 Milo 55160 (Milo 55160)
 Scaredy Squirrel (Nestor)
 Go, Dog. Go! (Grandpaw Barker)
 John A.: Birth of a Country (TV movie) (Alexander Galt)
 Remedy (Frank Kanaskie)
 The Masked Saint (Judd Lumpkin)
 Forever Knight ("Dance by the Light of the Moon, season 1, ep. 5)
 Stories From My Childhood (Various characters)
 The ZhuZhus (Wilfred P. Kerdle)
 Margarita (Ben)
 Everywhere (Jim)
 Rick Mercer Report The Ron James Show The Debaters Mysticons (King Darius; supporting role)
 The Music Man (Remake, 2003) (Anvil salesman Charlie Cowell)
 Murdoch Mysteries (5 episodes, 2010-2019) (Detective/ Inspector Hamish Slorach)
 Esme and Roy (Roy)
 Robocop: The Series (1994) (Umberto Ortega, Talk Show Host)
 Pink Is In (Colonel Kwoka)
 Moville Mysteries'' (Victor's father)

References

External links

 
 Patrick McKenna's Official Website

1960 births
Living people
Male actors from Hamilton, Ontario
Canadian male film actors
Canadian male television actors
Canadian male voice actors
Best Actor in a Drama Series Canadian Screen Award winners
20th-century Canadian male actors
21st-century Canadian male actors
Best Supporting Actor in a Drama Series Canadian Screen Award winners